Massimo Vignelli (January 10, 1931 – May 27, 2014) was an Italian designer who worked in a number of areas including packaging, houseware, furniture, public signage, and showroom design. He was the co-founder of Vignelli Associates, with his wife, Lella. His motto was, "If you can design one thing, you can design everything," which the broad range of his work reflects.

Vignelli worked firmly within the modernist tradition. His style stressed simplicity by using basic geometric shapes.

Life
Vignelli studied architecture at the Politecnico di Milano and later at the Università Iuav di Venezia.

From 1957 to 1960, he visited America on a fellowship, and returned to New York in 1966 to start the New York branch of a new company, Unimark International, which quickly became, in scope and personnel, one of the largest design firms in the world. The firm went on to design many of the world's most recognizable corporate identities, including that of American Airlines (which forced him to incorporate the eagle, Massimo was always quick to point out). Vignelli designed the iconic signage for the New York City Subway system during this period, and the 1970s–80s map of the system. Contrary to news reports, Vignelli did not design the Washington Metro Map, which was designed by Lance Wyman and Bill Cannan. Vignelli created the signage and wayfinding system for the DC Metro and suggested it be named "Metro" like many other capital city subways. Its original name was a mishmash of various states and transportation groups.

In 1971, Vignelli resigned from Unimark, in part because the design vision which he supported became diluted as the company diversified and increasingly stressed marketing, rather than design. Soon after, Massimo and Lella Vignelli founded Vignelli Associates.

Vignelli worked with filmmaker Gary Hustwit on the documentary Helvetica, about the typeface of the same name. Vignelli also updated his 1972 New York City Subway map for an online-only version implemented in 2011 and described as a "diagram", not a map, to reflect its abstract design without surface-level features such as streets and parks.

Vignelli equipped his own home with tables, chairs, lamps and other items that he designed himself.

Vignelli died on May 27, 2014 in New York City.

Work
Vignelli worked in a wide variety of areas, including interior design, environmental design, package design, graphic design, furniture design, and product design. His clients at Vignelli Associates included high-profile companies such as IBM, Knoll, Bloomingdale's and American Airlines. His former employee Michael Bierut wrote that "it seemed to me that the whole city of New York was a permanent Vignelli exhibition [around 1981]. To get to the office, I rode in a subway with Vignelli-designed signage, shared the sidewalk with people holding Vignelli-designed Bloomingdale’s shopping bags, walked by St. Peter’s Church with its Vignelli-designed pipe organ visible through the window. At Vignelli Associates, at 23 years old, I felt I was at the center of the universe."

Vignelli participated in the Stock Exchange of Visions project in 2007, as well as publishing the book, Vignelli: From A to Z, containing a series of essays describing the principles and concepts behind "all good design".  It is alphabetically organized by topic, roughly approximating a similar course he taught at Harvard's School of Design and Architecture.

Vignelli's designs were famous for following a minimal aesthetic and a narrow range of typefaces that Vignelli considered to be perfect in their genre, including Akzidenz-Grotesk, Bodoni, Helvetica, Garamond No. 3 and Century Expanded. He wrote that, "In the new computer age, the proliferation of typefaces and type manipulations represents a new level of visual pollution threatening our culture. Out of thousands of typefaces, all we need are a few basic ones, and trash the rest."

In January 2009, Vignelli released The Vignelli Canon as a free e-book; an expanded version was printed in September 2010. A PDF version can be downloaded from the Vignelli Center at the Rochester Institute of Technology. In the introduction Vignelli writes, "I thought that it might be useful to pass some of my professional knowledge around, with the hope of improving [young designers'] design skills. Creativity needs the support of knowledge to be able to perform at its best."

Vignelli worked with the National Park Service and the design staff at the Harpers Ferry Center in creation of the "Unigrid System." The system has been used since 1977 in creation of park brochures in all national parks locations.

New York City Subway map

In August 1972, Vignelli's design for the New York City Subway map appeared on the walls of subway stations and became a landmark in Modernist information design. Vignelli regarded the map as one of his finest creations.

Origin of the map
The origins of the map lie in the problems of the previous decade. In the mid-1960s New York City Transit Authority was facing unprecedented difficulties in delivering information to its riders:
 Inconsistent and out-of-date signage still referred to the old operating companies (IRT, BMT, IND) long after they had been subsumed under a single public authority.
 An influx of 52 million visitors for the 1964 New York World's Fair (April 1964 to October 1965) highlighted shortcomings in wayfinding information for public transportation in New York City.
 Structural changes to the subway network (costing $100 million) to reduce bottlenecks, in particular the Chrystie Street Connection (approved 1963, expected 1965, opened at the end of 1967), effectively merged two of the three historical networks.

To deal with this, the TA created the role of Director of Public Information and Community Relations, and hired former newspaper reporter Len Ingalls. In his later years, Vignelli often said that the most important factor in the success of a design project was having a good client, and he praised Ingalls for being a very good one. Ingalls began an overhaul of both signage and the subway map. When Unimark International opened an office in New York in 1965, Mildred Constantine, curator of design at the Museum of Modern Art (MoMA) put Ingalls in touch with Vignelli, who headed up the New York office from the end of 1965. In the Spring of 1966, the TA engaged Unimark to redesign the subway signage and review the ongoing changes to the map. Robert Noorda and Massimo Vignelli created a system of signage that the TA adopted and which still pervades every station in the subway today. But the TA did not follow up Vignelli's preliminary study of the map as they were already at the testing stage of their own new map.

The 1970s Vignelli map
The TA's new map, released in 1967, used Raleigh D'Adamo's principle of color-coding for the first time, but it suffered from what Vignelli called "fragmentation" and was not well received. The following year, the parent body Metropolitan Transportation Authority (MTA) was formed over the TA, chaired by Dr William J. Ronan, who wanted to create a modern brand image for this new body. While the Unimark signage project was still being finished off up with the creation of the New York City Transit Authority Graphics Standards Manual, Vignelli went to Ronan with a mock-up of part of the map for lower Manhattan. Ronan approved it, and in July 1970 the TA awarded Unimark a contract to design a new system map.

The map was put together in the Unimark Office by Joan Charysyn under Vignelli's design direction. In April 1971, Vignelli left Unimark to set up Vignelli Associates. By this time, the map was almost complete, but was subject to corrections and modifications requested by Raleigh D'Adamo, who was now Head of the Office of Inspection and Review at the MTA. These changes were carried out by Charysyn, who also oversaw the printing of the map. Unimark's liaison with the MTA during this project was handled by Norbert Oehler. The map was unveiled by Ronan on August 4, 1972 at a ceremony in the station at 57th Street and Sixth Avenue.

After the mechanical for the map was handed over in 1972, Vignelli had no further control over the map. Six further editions were produced from 1973 to 1978, with extensive changes. In 1974, William Ronan was replaced by David Yunich as chairman of the MTA. Yunich was formerly an executive at Macy's department store, and brought an explicit intention to 'sell' the subway to riders. He recruited Fred Wilkinson from Macy's who formed the Subway Map Committee in 1975 to design a new map to replace Vignelli's. The next year John Tauranac was made chair of the committee, which concluded in June 1979 with a geographic map using a trunk-based color scheme designed by Michael Herz Associates. The Vignelli map was replaced by a newer design, which is still used.

The 2000s Vignelli map

At the end of 2007, Mark Rozzo, an editor at Men's Vogue magazine, invited Vignelli to submit a commemorative edition of his map for inclusion in a 'design classics' edition of the magazine. This invitation precipitated the thinking of the team at Vignelli Associates, who had for some time been considering how they would do the map differently. Massimo Vignelli, Yoshiki Waterhouse, and Beatriz Cifuentes worked together to build a new, up-to-date map from scratch. Besides the general principle of a systematic and minimalist design, they added the specific requirement that the map should preserve spatial relations between stations. For example if one station is east of another station in real life, then it must be so on the map. This defused one of the most persistent criticisms of the 1972 map. Their wholly new map was released through the May 2008 edition of Men's Vogue: within hours, all 500 signed prints were sold for charity at US $299 each.

In 2011, the MTA began to look at ways of displaying service disruptions due to weekend engineering works in a visual format. They invited Vignelli to develop a digital version of the 2008 map. This was released on the MTA's Weekender web site on September 16, 2011. Since then it has undergone several revisions and is still in use today, with weekly updates of service changes.

Super Bowl map
The last map in which Vignelli was involved was a special transit map, designed by Yoshiki Waterhouse at Vignelli Associates, for Super Bowl XLVIII. The game was played on February 2, 2014, at MetLife Stadium at the Meadowlands Sports Complex in East Rutherford, New Jersey, the first Super Bowl played outdoors in a cold-weather city.

Private cars were not allowed to park at the stadium, so the use of public transportation was correspondingly increased. With 400,000 visitors expected to the area and 80,000 attendees expected at the game itself, the MTA decided to work with New Jersey Transit (NJT), Amtrak, and NY Waterway to produce a special-purpose Regional Transit Map. The map brought in several innovations: 
 The transit map showed both New York and New Jersey. It was the first time that an MTA-produced subway map had done that.
 Besides showing the New York City Subway, the map also includes the MTA's Metro-North Railroad and Long Island Rail Road, New Jersey Transit lines, and Amtrak lines, all in the consistent visual language of the Vignelli map.
 For the first time since 1979, the MTA issued a Vignelli map on paper.
 For the first time, a Vignelli map added in topographic features (the MetLife Stadium, the Prudential Center, and the Super Bowl Boulevard).

SuperWarmRed
The Vignelli discipline of mapmaking is continued by Waterhouse and Cifuentes through the new design firm SuperWarmRed Designs, formed in December 2014. Prints of the 2012 edition of the subway map as used in the MTA Weekender site can be obtained through SuperWarmRed.

Vignelli Center for Design Studies

In 2008, Massimo and Lella Vignelli agreed to donate the entire archive of their design work to Rochester Institute of Technology. The archive is housed in a new building designed by Lella and Massimo Vignelli, The Vignelli Center For Design Studies. The building, which opened in September 2010, includes among its many offerings exhibition spaces, classrooms, and offices. Massimo Vignelli said of it:

The Vignelli Center for Design Studies will house our comprehensive archive of graphic design, furniture and objects, under the direction of R. Roger Remington, the Vignelli Distinguished Professor of Design at RIT, the center will foster studies related to Modernist design with programs and exhibitions on our work as well as other related subjects. The first one of its kind and size, The Vignelli Center will position RIT on the international forefront of design studies. Lella and I are delighted to see our dream taking shape.

Awards

Vignelli was given the following awards and honorary doctorates:
1964 – Gran Premio Triennale di Milano
1964, 1998 – Compasso d’Oro, from (ADI), Italian Association for Industrial Design
1973 – Industrial Arts Medal of the American Institute of Architects (AIA)
1982 – New York Art Directors Club Hall of Fame
1982 – Honorary Doctorate in Fine Arts from Parsons School of Design, New York
1983 – AIGA Gold Medal
1985 – first Presidential Design Award, presented by President Ronald Reagan, for the National Park Service Publications Program
1987 – Honorary Doctorate in Fine Arts from Pratt Institute, Brooklyn, New York
1988 – Interior Design Hall of Fame.
1988 – Honorary Doctorate in Fine Arts from Rhode Island School of Design, Providence, Rhode Island
1991 – National Arts Club Gold Medal for Design
1992 – Interior Product Designers Fellowship of Excellence
1993 – New York State Governor’s Award for Excellence
1994 – Honorary Doctorate in Architecture from the University of Venice, Italy
1994 – Honorary Doctorate in Fine Arts from Corcoran School of Art, Washington D.C.
1995 – Brooklyn Museum Design Award for Lifetime Achievement
1996 – Honorary Royal Designer for Industry Award, Royal Society of Arts, London
2000 – Honorary Doctorate in Fine Arts from Art Center College of Design, Pasadena, California
2002 – Honorary Doctorate in Fine Arts from Rochester Institute of Technology, Rochester, New York
2003 – National Lifetime Achievement Award from the National Museum of Design at Cooper-Hewitt, New York
2004 – Visionary Award from the Museum of Art and Design, New York
2005 – Architecture Award from the American Academy of Arts and Letters, NY

Publications

References

External links

Cooper Hewitt Collection (Pitcher for Christofle silver and Venini Glassworks)
Cooper Hewitt Collection ("Fungo" lamp for Venini Glassworks)
Museum of Modern Art (Stacking Dinnerware for Articoli Plastici Elettrici, Italy)
Vignelli, film presented by the Virginia Commonwealth University, School of the Arts (interview)

AIGA medalists
Italian industrial designers
Italian graphic designers
Italian designers
Logo designers
Polytechnic University of Milan alumni
Compasso d'Oro Award recipients
1931 births
2014 deaths
Royal Designers for Industry
Olivetti people